is a railway station on the Tokyu Ikegami Line in Ōta, Tokyo, Japan, operated by the private railway operator Tokyu Corporation.

Station layout
This station has two opposed side platforms serving two tracks.

Platforms

Traffic
In 2014, 14,910 passengers per day started or ended travel at the station in average.

History 

In April 1928, it was renamed . On January 1, 1936, it was renamed , and on January 20, 1966, the Japanese name was changed to the present-day form.

See also
 List of railway stations in Japan

References

External links 
 Kugahara Station (Tokyu) 

Railway stations in Tokyo
Tokyu Ikegami Line
Stations of Tokyu Corporation
Railway stations in Japan opened in 1923